The Capture of Vigilant was an incident in May 1745 of the naval warfare of King George's War. British forces captured the French vessel Vigilant off Nova Scotia.

It involved Commodore Warren in HMS Superb (60 guns), Captain Durell in HMS Eltham (40 guns), Captain Calmady in HMS Launceston, Captain Douglas in HMS Mermaid and Captain John Rous of HMS Shirley Galley who fought the French ship Vigilant (64 guns) off Louisbourg. Douglas in Mermaid (40 guns) engaged the French ship. John Rous in Shirley Galley was the first to fire, giving the ship several broadsides into the stern. Captain Durell was next to give a broadside. The commodore got alongside the ship - they fired briskly, tearing the rigging and sails to pieces. Fog settled in and Vigilant got away. In the morning, Vigilant was visible and clearly wrecked.  The British took 100 French sailors prisoner to Boston.

References

Sources
 Canadian Biography - Edward Tyng
  Memoirs of Edward Tyng, Esquire ... and of Hon. William Tyng ... By Edward Tyng, William Tyng, Timothy Alden
 Capture of the Vigilant, A particular history of the five years French and Indian war in New England ... By Samuel Gardner Drake p. 209
 
  French third rate ship of the line 'Le Vigilant' (1744)
  Seeds of Discontent: The Deep Roots of the American Revolution, 1650-1750 By J. Revell Car, p. 244
 Blue Pete
 

Military history of Nova Scotia
Vigilant
Vigilant